Osku County is in East Azerbaijan province, Iran. The capital of the county is the city of Osku. At the 2006 census, the county's population was 84,061 in 23,613 households. The following census in 2011 counted 98,988 people in 30,091 households. At the 2016 census, the county's population was 158,270 in 50,674 households.

Osku is one of the oldest cities in East Azerbaijan, according to old books, and is like stepping into a time machine. The city is located on a volcano hillside and has many caves in the city. The inhabitants of Osku are Azerbaijani Turks, who have lived in the city for more than 100 years. Attractions such as Kandovan and natural landscapes make Osku one of the touristic cities in Iran. It is one of the few cities in Iran where batik printing centers still remain in operation. Osku is presently known as the capital of batik in Iran. Hilleh Historical Village is another historical village near to the city, currently abandoned.

Administrative divisions

The population history and structural changes of Osku County's administrative divisions over three consecutive censuses are shown in the following table. The latest census shows two districts, five rural districts, and three cities.

References

 

Counties of East Azerbaijan Province